Sotiris-Polykarpos Alexandropoulos (born 26 November 2001) is a Greek professional footballer who plays as a defensive midfielder for Portuguese club Sporting CP and the Greece national team.

Club career

Panathinaikos
Alexandropoulos plays mainly as a midfielder and joined Panathinaikos from the team's youth ranks. Having recently just turned 19, he's become a near automatic starter for Panathinaikos at the 2019-20 season, when you consider that the team has had three coaches in 6 months and that Alexandropoulos missed a whole season recovering from a bad leg injury. In the Greek League playoffs he was arguably Panathinaikos's best player, while he hadn't played much under the Spanish coach Dani Poyatos.
On 15 June 2021, he signed an extension with the club until the summer of 2024. On 11 September 2021, he scores his first goal for Panathinaikos senior team, against Apollon Smyrnis on a 4-1 win, at the first game of the season

On 21 May 2022, Alexandropoulos won the Greek Cup with Panathinaikos against PAOK. That was his first trophy at his senior career.

Sporting CP
On 29 August 2022, Alexandropoulos signed a five-year contract with Portuguese club Sporting CP for a fee of €4.5 million, with Panathinaikos also receiving 30% of a future transfer. On 2 September, he made his debut for the club, replacing Manuel Ugarte in the 89th minute in a 2–0 away win against Estoril in the Primeira Liga.

International career
On 24 March 2021, Alexandropoulos was called up to the Greek senior team by coach John van 't Schip for the forthcoming World Cup 2022 qualifiers against Spain and Georgia. On 28 March 2021, he made his debut with the national team as a substitute in a friendly match against Honduras.

Career statistics

Club

International

Honours
Panathinaikos
Greek Cup: 2021–22
Individual
Super League Greece Young Player of the Year: 2021–22

References

2001 births
Living people
Greece under-21 international footballers
Greece youth international footballers
Panathinaikos F.C. players
Super League Greece players
Association football midfielders
Greece international footballers
Footballers from Athens
Greek footballers